The 2011 Ford 400 was a NASCAR Sprint Cup Series motor race that was held on November 20, 2011, at Homestead-Miami Speedway in Homestead, Florida. It was the thirty-sixth and final race of the 2011 NASCAR Sprint Cup Series season. The event aired on ESPN and Motor Racing Network. Carl Edwards entered the event with a three-point lead over Tony Stewart in the championship standings. Edwards won the pole and finished second, while Stewart won the race. This left the two drivers tied atop the standings, and Stewart was awarded the title on the tiebreaker of most wins (five to one).

This race also marked Geoffrey Bodine's final career start.

Background

Race report

Practice and qualifying
Two practice sessions were held. They were originally scheduled for the afternoon of Friday, November 18, but were moved to Saturday morning after Friday's schedule was washed out by rain. Championship contenders Carl Edwards and Tony Stewart were second and fifteenth on the chart, respectively. Stewart managed only 28th, over a half second slower than Edwards.

Qualifying was held Saturday afternoon. Martin Truex Jr. qualified second, while Kasey Kahne, Kurt Busch, and Brad Keselowski rounded out the top five. Stewart was ranked 15th.

Race summary
After pre-race ceremonies and pace laps, the green flag waved to start the race at 3:20 p.m. ET. Edwards immediately took the lead, claiming a bonus point toward the championship, while Stewart began working his way through the field, moving into the top ten by lap 11. The caution flag waved for the first time on lap 13 as a light rain began falling. During the ensuing round of pit stops, both Edwards and Stewart took two tires; Edwards retained the lead, while Stewart came out of the pits in eighth place. Three laps later, Stewart returned to pit road for repairs to his car's grille, leaving him in 40th place for the restart on lap 22. Stewart worked his way up to 27th within seven laps, and when a debris caution waved on lap 34, bragged over the radio that he was going to come back and win the race. The field hit pit road, and Edwards slipped to third position while Stewart's crew took extra time to work his car, sacrificing many of the positions gained since the first restart.

The race was restarted on lap 37, and Edwards returned to the lead on lap 48, while Stewart charged through the field, working his way up to 12th by lap 68. During this run, the car of Edwards's Roush Fenway Racing teammate, Marcos Ambrose, developed engine problems, losing a cylinder. Green-flag pit stops began on lap 76. Steward pitted on lap 79, and Edwards hit pit road one lap later. Both took four tires and adjustments. The caution flew again on lap 83 as David Ragan, Edwards's teammate at Roush Fenway Racing, blew his engine. Edwards retook the lead when the final pitstops of the cycle were made under yellow, while Stewart took the lap 87 restart in 10th place. Stewart climbed to fifth by the time the race was stopped for rain after 109 laps.

The rain delay lasted slightly over an hour, and the race resumed under the yellow flag at approximately 6:00 pm ET. After pit stops, Edwards restarted third, with Stewart right beside him in fourth. Stewart immediately took second and moved into the lead six laps later, claiming the lap leader bonus point for himself as well. The caution waved for debris on lap 133, and both championship contenders lost positions on pit stops. After a restart and another quick caution, Edwards restarted third, Stewart from ninth. Edwards dropped back and was passed by Stewart one lap later. On lap 142, the caution flew again when Jimmie Johnson spun at turn 4. Stewart took the lead by the time the caution waved again on lap 154. A slow pit stop dropped Stewart to ninth on the restart, and he quickly began moving back up. Stewart bumped Edwards as the two were racing for third position, prompting NASCAR officials to tell Stewart to cut it out. Edwards moved back into the lead on lap 176 as Stewart moved into third. By the time green-flag pit stops began on lap 190, Edwards had clinched a second bonus point for leading the most laps.

Edwards pitted on lap 202, while Stewart gambled on fuel mileage by not pitting until lap 212, hoping to make that his last stop. One lap later, the yellow flew again for rain with Edwards in the lead. Edwards pitted again under the yellow, taking two tires and topping off his fuel tank so that he too could go the rest of the way. Officials finally declared the track dry and restarted the race on lap 231 with Stewart in third place. With fresher tires than the cars in front of him, Stewart needed only one lap to retake the lead. Edwards moved into second three laps later, but could not catch Stewart as a result of Stewart having fresher left-side tires. Stewart won the race, with Edwards second, Truex Jr. third, Matt Kenseth fourth, and Jeff Gordon fifth.

Results

Qualifying

Race results

Standings after the race

Drivers' Championship standings

Manufacturers' Championship standings

References and notes

Ford 400
Ford 400
NASCAR races at Homestead-Miami Speedway
November 2011 sports events in the United States